The Fürth Crime Museum is a museum on crime and policing in the city of Fürth in Bavaria, Germany.

The museum covers the period from the 19th century, starting with the establishment of the commission on policing and justice by Karl August von Hardenberg and the police of the Kingdom of Bavaria. The museum opened on 22 September 2010 in the former courtroom of the town's Rathaus or town hall.

References

External links
 Museum website

2010 establishments in Germany
Museums established in 2010
Law enforcement museums in Germany
Museums in Bavaria
Buildings and structures in Fürth
Crime museums